Kin Ming Estate is a public housing estate in Tiu Keng Leng, Tseung Kwan O, New Territories, Hong Kong, near MTR Tiu Keng Leng station. It is the eighth public housing estate in Tseung Kwan O and consists of ten housing blocks completed in 2003.

Background
Kin Ming Estate was formerly the site of Tiu Keng Leng Cottage Area, an area settled by Kuomintang Army in Hong Kong after Chinese Civil War ended in 1949. After the area was demolished in 1997, a massive clearance, reclamation and redevelopment programme was carried out. The Tiu Keng Leng slope was flattened into two huge platforms to construct Kin Ming Estate and Choi Ming Court on the reclaimed land afterwards.

Kin Ming Estate was originally a HOS court called Kin Ming Court, but it was changed to rental housing finally and renamed to the current name.

Houses

Demographics
According to the 2016 by-census, Kin Ming Estate had a population of 19,889. The median age was 42.8 and the majority of residents (96.7 per cent) were of Chinese ethnicity. The average household size was 2.9 people. The median monthly household income of all households (i.e. including both economically active and inactive households) was HK$21,250.

Politics
For the 2019 District Council election, the estate fell within two constituencies. Most of the estate falls within the Kin Ming constituency, which was represented by Leung Li until May 2021, while the remainder falls within the Choi Kin constituency, which is represented by Chan Wai-lit.

See also

Public housing estates in Tseung Kwan O

References

Public housing estates in Hong Kong
Residential buildings completed in 2003
Tiu Keng Leng
Tseung Kwan O